Takeharu Aso (21 November 1899 – 30 May 1993) was a Japanese cross-country skier. He competed in the men's 50 kilometre event at the 1928 Winter Olympics. He was also a middle-distance runner and shared in the 1500 metres national title with Eiichi Nagayama at the 1919 Japan Championships in Athletics.

References

1899 births
1993 deaths
Sportspeople from Tokyo
Japanese male middle-distance runners
Japanese male cross-country skiers
Olympic cross-country skiers of Japan
Cross-country skiers at the 1928 Winter Olympics
Japan Championships in Athletics winners
Athletes from Tokyo
20th-century Japanese people